Samaritani is a surname. Notable people with the surname include:

 Alberto Alberani Samaritani (born 1947), Italian water polo goalkeeper
 Pierluigi Samaritani (1942–1994), Italian opera director/production designer

See also 

 Samaritan (disambiguation)